Want So Much to Believe (Swedish: Vill så gärna tro) is a 1971 romance film. It is directed by Gunnar Höglund and stars Johnny Nash and Christina Schollin.

References

External links 
 
 

1971 films
1970s romance films
Films directed by Gunnar Höglund
Swedish romance films
1970s Swedish films